Arthur Chichester, 1st Baron Chichester (May 1563 – 19 February 1625; known between 1596 and 1613 as Sir Arthur Chichester), of Carrickfergus in Ireland, was an English administrator and soldier who served as Lord Deputy of Ireland from 1605 to 1616. He was instrumental in the development and expansion of Belfast, now Northern Ireland's capital. Several streets are named in honour of himself and his nephew and heir Arthur Chichester, 1st Earl of Donegall, including Chichester Street and the adjoining Donegall Place, site of the Belfast City Hall.

Origins
Arthur Chichester was the second son of Sir John Chichester (d.1569), of Raleigh, Pilton, in North Devon, a leading member of the Devonshire gentry, a naval captain, and ardent Protestant who served as Sheriff of Devon in 1550–1551, and as Knight of the Shire for Devon in 1547, April 1554, and 1563, and as Member of Parliament for Barnstaple in 1559. Arthur's mother was Gertrude Courtenay, a daughter of Sir William Courtenay (1477–1535) "The Great", of Powderham, Devon, 6th in descent from The 2nd Earl of Devon (died 1377), MP for Devon in 1529, thrice Sheriff of Devon, in 1522, 1525–6, 1533–4, an Esquire of the Body to King Henry VIII, whom he accompanied to the Field of the Cloth of Gold.

Career
After attending Exeter College, Oxford, favoured by many Devonians, Chichester commanded HMS Larke against the Spanish Armada in 1588. In 1595 he accompanied Sir Francis Drake on his last expedition to the Americas. Later in the Anglo–Spanish War, he commanded a company during the 1596 raid on Cádiz, for which he was knighted. A year later he was with English forces in France fighting with King Henry IV against the Spanish in Picardy.  He was wounded in the shoulder during the Siege of Amiens in September 1597 during which the city was captured from the Spanish. He was knighted by Henry for his valour.

Ireland 

His career in Ireland began when in 1598 The 2nd Earl of Essex appointed him Governor of Carrickfergus, following the death of his brother, Sir John Chichester, who had been killed at the Battle of Carrickfergus the previous year. It is said that Sir John Chichester was decapitated, and his head was used as a football by the MacDonnell clan after their victory. James Sorley MacDonnell, commander of the clan's forces at the Battle of Carrickfergus, was poisoned in Dunluce Castle on the orders of Robert Cecil to placate Chichester.

During the Nine Years' War Chichester commanded royal troops in Ulster. His tactics included a scorched earth policy. He encircled The Earl of Tyrone's forces with garrisons, effectively starving the Earl's troops. In a 1600 letter to Cecil, he stated "a million swords will not do them so much harm as one winter's famine". While these tactics were not initially devised by Chichester, he carried them out ruthlessly, gaining a hate-figure status among the Irish. Lord Tyrone's weakening military position forced him to abandon and destroy his capital at Dungannon.

Following the signing of the Treaty of Mellifont, he succeeded The 1st Earl of Devonshire (previously known as Lord Mountjoy) as Lord Deputy of Ireland from 3 February 1605. A year later in 1606 he married Lettice Perrot, widow successively of Walter Vaughan of Golden Grove, Carmarthenshire, and John Langhorne of St Brides, Pembrokeshire, and daughter of Sir John Perrot, a former Lord Deputy of Ireland.

Lord Deputy Chichester saw Irish Catholicism as a major threat to the Crown. He oversaw widespread persecution of Catholics, and ordered the execution of two bishops, including the aged and respected Conor O'Devany. His relations with the traditionally Catholic nobility of the Pale, in particular The 10th Baron Howth, who could be quite quarrelsome, were poor. In Lord Howth's violent feuds with the new English settler families, particularly Thomas Jones, Archbishop of Dublin, and his son, and Viscount Moore of Drogheda, Chichester invariably sided against Howth but was unable to completely break his influence as he was a favourite of King James VI and I.

Following the Flight of the Earls in 1607, Chichester was a leading figure during the Plantation of Ulster. Initially, he intended that the number of Scottish planters would be small, with native Irish landowners gaining more land. However, after O'Doherty's Rebellion in County Donegal in 1608, his plans changed and all the native lords lost their land. Most of the land was awarded to wealthy landowners from England and Scotland. However, Chichester successfully campaigned to award veterans of the Nine Years' War land as well, funded by the City of London Livery Companies.

Later life 
Chichester was instrumental in the development and expansion of Belfast, now Northern Ireland's capital. In 1611, he built a new Belfast Castle on the site of an earlier Norman fortification, the Norman structure probably dating from the late twelfth-century or the very early thirteenth-century. In 1613, he was elevated to the Peerage of Ireland as The 1st Baron Chichester. Ill health in 1614 led to his retirement and his term of office was ended in February 1616. In his final years, Lord Chichester served as an ambassador to the Habsburg Empire.

Marriage and children
In 1606 he married Lettice Perrot, widow successively of Walter Vaughan of Golden Grove, Carmarthenshire, and of John Langhorne of St Brides, Pembrokeshire, and daughter of Sir John Perrot, a former Lord Deputy of Ireland. By her he had an only son who died an infant:
 Arthur Chichester (born 22 September 1606, died October 1606) who died an infant aged one month and was buried in Christ Church, Dublin, on 31 October 1606.

Death and succession
Lord Chichester died from pleurisy in London in 1625 and was buried seven months later in St Nicholas' Church, Carrickfergus. The Barony of Chichester became extinct on his death but was revived the same year in favour of his younger brother Edward, who was raised to the peerage as The 1st Viscount Chichester. Edward's son was Arthur, 1st Earl of Donegall.

Legacy
The family's influence in Belfast is still evident. Several streets are named in its honour, including Donegall Place, site of the Belfast City Hall and the adjacent Chichester Street.

Further reading
An Account of the Rt. Honourable Arthur, first Lord Chichester, Lord Deputy of Ireland, by his Nephew, Sir Faithful Fortescue, Knight, a short biography by his nephew Sir Faithful Fortescue (1585–1666) who followed his uncle to Ireland and stated "noe man knew his composition and disposition better than myself".

Notes

References
 

Lords Lieutenant of Ireland
16th-century Anglo-Irish people
17th-century Anglo-Irish people
English soldiers
People from County Antrim
Military personnel from Barnstaple
Barons in the Peerage of Ireland
Peers of Ireland created by James I
1563 births
1625 deaths
Arthur
People of O'Doherty's rebellion
16th-century English nobility
17th-century English nobility
People of the Nine Years' War (Ireland)
Knights Bachelor
Kingdom of England people in the Kingdom of Ireland